Singles is a compilation album by the popular Greek singer Despina Vandi, containing her most successful singles under the EMI Music Greece label (with whom she was signed from her debut in 1994 until 2000). The compilation includes singles taken from the albums Gela Mou (1994), Esena Perimeno (1996), Deka Entoles (1997), and Profities (1999). It also included tracks from the singles "Spania" (1997) and "Ipofero" (2001). The CD was also released in Germany and other European countries.

Track listing

Release history

Credits and personnel
Credits adapted from the album's liner notes.

Personnel
Natalia Germanou - lyrics
Vasilis Karras - music, lyrics
Tony Kontaxakis - music
Lambis Livieratos - lyrics
Phoebus - music, lyrics
Despina Vandi - vocals

Production
Panos Bothos - transfer
Eva Tsakmatsian - repertoire selection

Design
Dimitris Panagiotakopoulos - artwork

References

External links
 Official site

2006 compilation albums
Albums produced by Phoebus (songwriter)
Despina Vandi compilation albums
Greek-language albums
Minos EMI compilation albums